Vakhdat Azamatovich Khanonov (born 25 July 2000) is a Tajikistani professional footballer who plays as a centre-back for Persian Gulf Pro League club Persepolis and the Tajikistan national team.

Club career

CSKA Pamir Dushanbe 
Khanonov scored for CSKA Pamir Dushanbe in their 4–1 defeat to FC Istiklol on 9 May 2019.

Persepolis 
On 7 November 2021, Khanonov left Istiklol with Manuchehr Safarov to sign for Iranian club Persepolis, on a contract until 30 June 2024. On 17 January 2022, Khanonov made his debut in a 3–0 away win against Zob Ahan Esfahan.

International career 
Khanonov made his senior team debut for Tajikistan on 16 December 2018 against Oman.

Career statistics

Club

International

Honours 
Istiklol
 Tajikistan Higher League: 2020
 Tajik Supercup: 2021

Persepolis
 Iranian Super Cup runner-up: 2021

Tajikistan
King's Cup: 2022

References 

2000 births
Living people
Tajikistani footballers
Association football central defenders
CSKA Pamir Dushanbe players
FC Istiklol players
Persepolis F.C. players
Tajikistan Higher League players
Persian Gulf Pro League players
Tajikistan youth international footballers
Tajikistan international footballers
Tajikistani expatriate footballers
Tajikistani expatriate sportspeople in Iran
Expatriate footballers in Iran